Kalinzi is an administrative ward in Kigoma District of Kigoma Region in Tanzania. 
In 2016 the Tanzania National Bureau of Statistics report there were 30,188 people in the ward, from 27,426 in 2012.

Villages / neighborhoods 
The ward has 3 villages and 25 hamlets.

 Kalinzi
 Businde
 Kabale
 Kalinzi
 Kisozi
 Kivumu A
 Kivumu B
 Mganza
 Mlangala
 Mlesi
 Rusuviwe
 Matyazo
 Busingo
 Kibisa
 Lamiya
 Lukinzo
 Matyazo A
 Matyazo B
 Mshenyi
 Mkabogo
 Bugale
 Kiliabila
 Kinyabwami
 Milinzi
 Mkabogo
 Msenga
 Ruhinga A
 Ruhinga B

References

Wards of Kigoma Region